S.A. de Obras y Servicios, COPASA is a Spanish construction company specializing in civil engineering projects. The company was founded in 1985 as Construcciones Paraño, S.A. (Copasa).

Projects

Vigo Airport
In 2010, a joint-bid by Copasa and San José resulted in the awarding of the contract for the Vigo Airport terminal expansion, worth 45 million euros.

Haramain High Speed Rail Project
Copasa was one of numerous Spanish businesses awarded a contract by the Saudi government for the Haramain High Speed Rail Project.

References

External links
 Official website

Companies established in 1985
Companies based in Galicia (Spain)
Construction and civil engineering companies of Spain
Construction and civil engineering companies established in 1985
Spanish companies established in 1985